The  closing ceremony of the 2014 Winter Paralympics was held on 16 March 2014 at 20:14 MSK (UTC+4) at the Fisht Olympic Stadium in Sochi, Russia.

Ceremony

Awards
During the Closing Ceremony, Toby Kane, a male alpine skier from Australia, and Bibian Mentel-Spee, a female snowboarder from the Netherlands, were named winners of the Whang Youn Dai Achievement Award, which is presented at every Paralympic Games for outstanding performances and overcoming adversity.

The flag was handed over to the mayor of PyeongChang, the host city of the next edition of the Winter Paralympics.

Anthems
  Russian State Children's Chorus Assembly – Russian national anthem
  Oleg Akkuratov – Paralympic anthem
  Seungwon Choi - South Korean national anthem

References

2014 Winter Paralympics
Paralympics closing ceremonies
Ceremonies in Russia